Ivan Andrew Sag (November 9, 1949 – September 10, 2013) was an American linguist and cognitive scientist. He did research in areas of syntax and semantics as well as work in computational linguistics.

Personal life
Born in Alliance, Ohio on November 9, 1949, Sag attended the Mercersburg Academy but was expelled shortly before graduation. He received a BA from the University of Rochester, an MA from the University of Pennsylvania—where he studied comparative Indo-European languages, Sanskrit, and sociolinguistics—and a PhD from MIT in 1976, writing his dissertation (advised by Noam Chomsky) on ellipsis.

Sag received a Mellon Fellowship at Stanford University in 1978-79, and remained in California from that point on. He was appointed a position in Linguistics at Stanford, and earned tenure there. He was married to sociolinguist Penelope Eckert.

Academic work
Sag made notable contributions to the fields of syntax, semantics, pragmatics, and language processing. His early work was as a member of the research teams that invented and developed head-driven phrase structure grammar (HPSG) as well as generalized phrase structure grammar, HPSG's immediate intellectual predecessor. Later, he worked on Sign-Based Construction Grammar, which blended HPSG with ideas from Berkeley Construction Grammar. 

He was the author or co-author of 10 books and over 100 articles. In general, his research late in life primarily concerned constraint-based, lexicalist models of grammar, and their relation to theories of language processing.

Sag was the Sadie Dernham Patek Professor in Humanities, Professor of Linguistics, and Director of the Symbolic Systems Program at Stanford University. A fellow of the American Academy of Arts and Sciences and the Linguistic Society of America, in 2005 he received the LSA's Fromkin Prize for distinguished contributions to the field of linguistics.

He was honored by a volume of studies published in 2013 in his honor, The Core and the Periphery: Data-Driven Perspectives on Syntax Inspired by Ivan A. Sag, edited by Philip Hofmeister and Elisabeth Norcliffe.

Selected publications

Sag, Ivan A. 1980.  Deletion and Logical Form. New York:Garland Press.
Gazdar, Gerald, Ewan Klein, Geoffrey K. Pullum, and Ivan A. Sag. 1985. Generalized Phrase Structure Grammar. Cambridge, MA: Harvard University Press and Oxford: Basil Blackwell's.
Sag, Ivan A., Gerald Gazdar, Thomas Wasow and Steven Weisler. 1985. "Coordination and How to Distinguish Categories." Natural Language and Linguistic Theory 3:117–171
Pollard, Carl, and Ivan A. Sag. 1987. Information-Based Syntax and Semantics; Volume One - Fundamentals. CSLI Lecture Notes Series No. 13. Stanford: CSLI Publications. Distributed by University of Chicago Press.
Nunberg, Geoffrey, Ivan A. Sag, and Thomas Wasow. 1994. "Idioms." Language 70:491– 538.
Pollard, Carl, and Ivan A. Sag. 1992. "Anaphors in English and the Scope of Binding Theory." Linguistic Inquiry 23.2:261–303.
Pollard, Carl, and Ivan A. Sag. 1994. Head-Driven Phrase Structure Grammar. Chicago: University of Chicago Press and Stanford: CSLI Publications.
Miller, Philip, and Ivan A. Sag. 1997. "French Clitic Movement Without Clitics or Movement." Natural Language and Linguistic Theory 15:573–639.
Sag, Ivan A. 1997. "English Relative Clause Constructions." Journal of Linguistics 33.2:431–484.
Jonathan Ginzburg and Ivan A. Sag. 2000. Interrogative Investigations: the form, meaning, and use of English Interrogatives. Stanford: CSLI Publications.
Bouma, Gosse, Robert Malouf, and Ivan A. Sag. 2001. "Satisfying Constraints on Extraction and Adjunction." Natural Language and Linguistic Theory 19.1:1–65.
Kim, Jong-Bok, and Ivan A. Sag. 2002. "French and English Negation without Head-Movement." Natural Language and Linguistic Theory 20.2:339-412.
Sag, Ivan A., Thomas Wasow, and Emily Bender. 2003. Syntactic Theory: A formal introduction. Second edition. Stanford: CSLI Publications.

References

1949 births
2013 deaths
Syntacticians
University of Rochester alumni
People from Alliance, Ohio
Linguists of Indo-European languages
Stanford University Department of Linguistics faculty
Deaths from cancer in California
Linguists from the United States
Writers from Ohio
Fellows of the Cognitive Science Society
Fellows of the American Academy of Arts and Sciences
Fellows of the Linguistic Society of America